Jennifer Taylor (born 16 August 1980) is an English volleyball player. She competed for Great Britain at the 2012 Summer Olympics.

References

English women's volleyball players
Volleyball players at the 2012 Summer Olympics
Olympic volleyball players of Great Britain
1980 births
Living people